Patrick Weihrauch (born 3 March 1994) is a German professional footballer who plays as a winger for  side Dynamo Dresden. He previously played for the reserve team of Bayern Munich, Würzburger Kickers and Arminia Bielefeld.

Career

Early career
Born in Gräfelfing, Germany, his youth career included SC Fürstenfeldbruck from 1 July 2006 to 30 June 2007, the youth academy for 1860 Munich from 1 July 2007 to 30 June 2010, and the youth academy for Bayern Munich from 1 July 2010 to 30 June 2012. In the 2011–12 season, in the Regionalliga Süd, he made two appearances for Bayern Munich II against the reserve teams of FSV Frankfurt and Ingolstadt 04. He then scored eight goals in 34 matches in the 2012–13 season in the Regionalliga Bayern. He also went on to score seven goals in 24 matches in the 2013–14 season. Bayern Munich II qualified for the promotion playoff where he made two appearances. He managed four goals in 26 matches for the 2014–15 season. During the 2015–16 season, he scored 14 goals in 31 matches. He was part of the first team squad for Bayern Munich but did not make any first team appearances.

Würzburger Kickers
On 2 June 2016, Weihrauch signed a four–year contract for Würzburger Kickers. On 14 August 2016, Weihrauch came on as a substitute in the 33rd minute of Würzburg's 1–1 draw against 1. FC Kaiserslautern on matchday two of the 2016–17 2. Bundesliga season. This was his first appearance of the season. His first start for Würzburger Kickers was on 19 August 2016 in a 1–0 win against Eintracht Braunschweig in the first round of the German Cup.

Arminia Bielefeld
On 9 June 2017, it was announced that Weihrauch signed with 2. Bundesliga club Arminia Bielefeld on a contract until 2020. He arrived on a free transfer, after his Würzburg contract had been invalidated by the club's relegation. He finished the 2017–18 season with three goals in 33 appearances.

Dynamo Dresden
In the summer of 2020, Weihrauch joined 3. Liga side Dynamo Dresden on a free transfer, signing a two-year contract.

Career statistics

References

1994 births
Living people
Association football wingers
German footballers
Germany youth international footballers
Sportspeople from Würzburg
Footballers from Bavaria
FC Bayern Munich II players
FC Bayern Munich footballers
Würzburger Kickers players
Arminia Bielefeld players
Dynamo Dresden players
2. Bundesliga players
3. Liga players
Regionalliga players